Eurydactylodes symmetricus, sometimes known commonly as the symmetrical gecko or the large-scaled chameleon gecko, is a species of lizard in the family Diplodactylidae. The species is endemic to Grande Terre in New Caledonia.

Habitat

Description

Reproduction
E. symmetricus is oviparous.

References

Further reading
Andersson LG (1908). "Two new Lizards (Eurydactylus and Lygosoma) from New Caledonia". Arkiv för Zoologi, Utgifvet af K. Svenska Vetenskapsakademien i Stockholm 4: 1–5. (Eurydactylus symmetricus, new species, pp. 1–4, Figures 1a–1d).
Langner C, Schönecker P (2018). "Pacific Lost World – die weniger bekannte, gefährdete Geckofauna Neukaledoniens ". Terraria-Elaphe (69): 14–26. (in German).
Rösler H (1995). Geckos der Welt – Alle Gattungen. Leipzig: Urania. 246 pp. (Eurydactylodes symmetricus, p. 70). (in German).

Eurydactylodes
Reptiles described in 1908
Taxa named by Lars Gabriel Andersson
Geckos of New Caledonia